Pilakkurichi is a village in the Sendurai taluk of Ariyalur district,(621806) Tamil Nadu, India.

Demographics 

As per the 2011 census, Pilakurichi had a total population of 3942 with 1938 males and 2004 females. Village surrounded by Cashew nut trees, all the four sides of the village has pond. It has five ponds and one lake.

References 

Villages in Ariyalur district